Ascalenia gastrocosma is a moth in the family Cosmopterigidae. It was described by Edward Meyrick in 1931. It is found in Bihar, India.

The forewings are blackish and the hindwings are grey. Adults have been recorded on wing in May, June and September.

The larvae feed on the leaves of Acacia catechu. They spin the leaves together.

References

Moths described in 1931
Ascalenia
Moths of Asia